S Orionis is an asymptotic giant branch star in the constellation Orion, approximately  away.  It varies regularly in brightness between extremes of magnitude 7.2 and 14 every 14 months.

Variability

S Orionis is a Mira variable that pulsates with an approximately 420‑day cycle, and varies in radius from 2.0 to 2.3 astronomical units.  The pulsations have been observed using VLTI and VLBA observations which measured an angular diameter varying between 7.9 and 9.7 mas.

The mean period of variation has been shown to change over time, from less than 410 days to over 440 days.  The variations are approximately sinusoidal with a weak, not statistically-significant, trend towards longer period.  The cycle of period changes is around 70 years within a total observation period of only about 100 years, so it is difficult to be certain about long-term behaviour.  However, this behaviour is not expected to be the result of thermal pulses or evolutionary changes, and the cause is unknown.

Companion
S Orionis is listed in the Washington Double Star Catalog as a double star with a tenth magnitude companion 47" away. The companion is G0 star HD 294176.

Circumstellar environment
S Orionis is surrounded by masers and dust condensed from its cool stellar wind. The size of the dust shells varies as the star pulsates and changes temperature, from around 8 AU to 10 AU across. The positions of the masers have been measured very accurately using VLBI.

References

Orion (constellation)
Mira variables
M-type giants
Orionis, S
036090
Emission-line stars
025673
Durchmusterung objects